The Chequamegon–Nicolet National Forest (the q is silent) is a  U.S. National Forest in northern Wisconsin in the United States.  Due to logging in the early part of the 20th century, very little old growth forest remains. Some of the trees that grow there today were planted by the Civilian Conservation Corps in the 1930s.  The national forest lands contain trees and vegetation corresponding to the North Woods Ecoregion that is prevalent throughout the upper Great Lakes region.

Legally two separate national forests—the Chequamegon National Forest and the Nicolet National Forest—the areas were established by presidential proclamations in 1933 and have been managed as one unit since 1998.

The Chequamegon National Forest comprises three units in the north-central part of the state totaling . In descending order of forestland area, it is located in parts of Bayfield, Ashland, Price, Sawyer, Taylor, and Vilas counties. Forest headquarters are in Park Falls. There are local ranger district offices in Glidden, Hayward, Medford, Park Falls, and Washburn. Moquah Barrens Research Natural Area is located with the Chequamegon. Lying within the Chequamegon are two officially designated wilderness areas of the National Wilderness Preservation System. These are the Porcupine Lake Wilderness and the Rainbow Lake Wilderness.

It is located in parts of Forest, Oconto, Florence, Vilas, Langlade, and Oneida counties. The forest headquarters are in Rhinelander. There are local ranger district offices in Eagle River, Florence, Lakewood, and Laona. Bose Lake Hemlock Hardwoods and the Franklin Lake Campground are located in the Nicolet. Lying within the Nicolet are three wildernesses—the Blackjack Springs Wilderness, the Headwaters Wilderness, and the Whisker Lake Wilderness.

Flora and fauna

Remote areas of uplands, bogs, wetlands, muskegs, rivers, streams, pine savannas, meadows and many glacial lakes are found throughout these forests.  Native tree species include Acer saccharum (sugar maple), Acer rubrum (red maple), and Acer spicatum (mountain maple), white, red, and black oaks, aspen, beech, basswood, sumac, and paper, yellow, and river birch.  Coniferous trees, including red, white, and jack pine, white spruce and balsam fir are abundant due to a dense second growth. Eastern hemlock are also present as this is the westernmost limit of its distribution. Tamarack/black spruce bogs, cedar swamps and alder thickets are common. Blueberries, raspberries, blackberries, cranberries, serviceberries, ferns, mosses, cattails, and mushrooms also grow here, as well as many more shrubs and wildflowers.

White-tailed deer are numerous and are hit by motorists on roads in northern Wisconsin year-round. Black bears, foxes, raccoons, rabbits, beavers, river otters, squirrels, chipmunks, pheasants, grouse and wild turkeys are popular game in the woods. Elk and wolves have been reintroduced and there have been sightings of moose and pine marten.  Bird species include northern cardinal, blue jay, Canada jay, common raven, boreal and black-capped chickadees, black-backed and pileated woodpeckers, red-winged blackbirds, owls, ducks, common loons, bald eagles, evening grosbeaks, red and white-winged crossbills  and many species of thrushes, sparrows and warblers. Brook trout, rainbow trout, and brown trout are found in many miles of excellent streams. Walleye, small and largemouth bass, crappie, northern pike, and many species of panfish make the area's lakes famous for freshwater fishing.  A record making muskellunge, Wisconsin's state fish, was caught in these waters.  The beauty, heritage, and recreational opportunities of these forests draw thousands of tourists to the Chequamegon–Nicolet area every year.

These national forests are best known for recreation, including camping, hiking, fishing, cross country skiing, and snowmobiling.

Clam Lake in Chequamegon National Forest was also home to one of the two extremely low frequency antennae in the United States.

Gallery

See also 
 Lake Namakagon

References

External links

 History on official website

National Forests of Wisconsin
Parks in Wisconsin
Old-growth forests
Civilian Conservation Corps in Wisconsin
Protected areas of Ashland County, Wisconsin
Protected areas of Bayfield County, Wisconsin
Protected areas of Price County, Wisconsin
Protected areas of Sawyer County, Wisconsin
Protected areas of Taylor County, Wisconsin
Protected areas of Vilas County, Wisconsin
Protected areas of Florence County, Wisconsin
Protected areas of Forest County, Wisconsin
Protected areas of Oconto County, Wisconsin
Protected areas of Langlade County, Wisconsin
Protected areas of Oneida County, Wisconsin
1933 establishments in Wisconsin
Protected areas established in 1933